Bayesian optimization is a sequential design strategy for global optimization of black-box functions  that does not assume any functional forms. It is usually employed to optimize expensive-to-evaluate functions.

History

Strategy

Bayesian optimization is typically used on problems of the form , where  is a set of points, which rely upon less than 20 dimensions, and whose membership can easily be evaluated. Bayesian optimization is particularly advantageous for problems where  is difficult to evaluate due to its computational cost. The objective function, is continuous and takes the form of some unknown structure, referred to as a "black box". Upon its evaluation, only  is observed and its derivatives are not evaluated.

Since the objective function is unknown, the Bayesian strategy is to treat it as a random function and place a prior over it. The prior captures beliefs about the behavior of the function. After gathering the function evaluations, which are treated as data, the prior is updated to form the posterior distribution over the objective function. The posterior distribution, in turn, is used to construct an acquisition function (often also referred to as infill sampling criteria) that determines the next query point.

There are several methods used to define the prior/posterior distribution over the objective function. The most common two methods use Gaussian processes in a method called kriging. Another less expensive method uses the Parzen-Tree Estimator to construct two distributions for 'high' and 'low' points, and then finds the location that maximizes the expected improvement.

Standard Bayesian optimization relies upon each  being easy to evaluate, and problems that deviate from this assumption are known as exotic Bayesian optimization problems. Optimization problems can become exotic if it is known that there is noise, the evaluations are being done in parallel, the quality of evaluations relies upon a tradeoff between difficulty and accuracy, the presence of random environmental conditions, or if the evaluation involves derivatives.

Acquisition functions
Examples of acquisition functions include 
 probability of improvement
 expected improvement
 Bayesian expected losses
 upper confidence bounds (UCB) or lower confidence bounds
 Thompson sampling 
and hybrids of these. They all trade-off exploration and exploitation so as to minimize the number of function queries. As such, Bayesian optimization is well suited for functions that are expensive to evaluate.

Solution methods
The maximum of the acquisition function is typically found by resorting to discretization or by means of an auxiliary optimizer. Acquisition functions are typically well-behaved  and are 
maximized using a numerical optimization technique, such as Newton's Method or quasi-Newton methods like the Broyden–Fletcher–Goldfarb–Shanno algorithm.

Applications
The approach has been applied to solve a wide range of problems, including learning to rank, computer graphics and visual design, robotics, sensor networks, automatic algorithm configuration, automatic machine learning toolboxes, reinforcement learning, planning, visual attention, architecture configuration in deep learning, static program analysis, experimental particle physics, chemistry, material design, and drug development.

See also
 Multi-armed bandit
 Kriging
 Thompson sampling
 Global optimization
 Bayesian experimental design
 Probabilistic numerics
 Pareto optimum

References

Sequential methods
Sequential experiments
Stochastic optimization
Machine learning